The Príncipe speirops (Zosterops leucophaeus) is a species of bird in the family Zosteropidae. It is endemic to the island of Príncipe in São Tomé and Príncipe. Its natural habitats are subtropical or tropical moist lowland forests and plantations. It is threatened by habitat loss.

References

Birds described in 1857
Endemic fauna of Príncipe
Endemic birds of São Tomé and Príncipe
Zosterops
Taxa named by Gustav Hartlaub
Taxonomy articles created by Polbot